Dabney Langhorne Friedrich (née Patricia Dabney Langhorne; born June 19, 1967) is an American attorney and jurist serving as a United States district court judge of the United States District Court for the District of Columbia. She previously served as a member of the United States Sentencing Commission.

Early life and education
Patricia Dabney Langhorne was born on June 19, 1967, in Pensacola, Florida. She received her Bachelor of Arts, magna cum laude, from Trinity University, her diploma in legal studies from University College, Oxford, and her Juris Doctor from Yale Law School, where she served as a Senior Editor of the Yale Journal on Regulation.

Career
Langhorne started her legal career as a law clerk for Judge Thomas F. Hogan of the United States District Court for the District of Columbia.
She served as an associate counsel to the president during the George W. Bush Administration, as chief crime counsel to Senator Orrin Hatch, as an assistant United States attorney in the Eastern District of Virginia, as a trial attorney at the United States Department of Justice, and as an assistant United States attorney in the Southern District of California.

In 2006, Friedrich was nominated by President George W. Bush as a member of the United States Sentencing Commission (and ultimately confirmed by the Senate on February 28, 2007), a position she held until 2016.  In that capacity, she helped establish sentencing policies and practices for the federal criminal justice system by promulgating guidelines for congressional review and recommending changes in criminal statutes.

Federal judicial service 
On May 8, 2017, President Donald Trump announced his intent to nominate Friedrich to serve as a United States district judge of the United States District Court for the District of Columbia, to a seat vacated by Reggie Walton, who assumed senior status on December 31, 2015. She was formally nominated on June 7, 2017. On July 25, 2017, the Senate Judiciary Committee held a hearing on her nomination. Her nomination was reported out of committee by a voice vote on September 14, 2017. On November 16, 2017, the United States Senate invoked cloture on her nomination by a 93–4 vote.  On November 27, 2017, her nomination was confirmed by a 97–3 vote. She received her judicial commission on December 1, 2017.

Concord Management and Consulting 
In June 2018, Friedrich rejected Russian-owned Concord Management and Consulting's request that she examine the instructions provided to the grand jury before the jury indicted the company. Concord accused Special Counsel Robert Mueller's prosecutors of giving faulty instructions, tainting the grand jury's decision to approve charges.

On August 13, 2018, in the case of United States v. Concord Management and Consulting LCC, she ruled against the defendant, one of 16 Russian entities charged by Special Counsel Robert Mueller, when it sought to void its indictment on the ground that Mueller's appointment to his position violated constitutional separation of powers. In a 41-page opinion, she held that although "no statute explicitly authorizes the Acting Attorney General to make the appointment, Supreme Court and D.C. Circuit precedent make clear that the Acting Attorney General has the necessary statutory authority," "the appointment does not violate core separation-of-powers principles. Nor has the Special Counsel exceeded his authority under the appointment order by investigating and prosecuting Concord."

In January 2019, Friedrich strongly rebuked the attorneys for Concord Management and Consulting for repeatedly making personal attacks on Mueller's team. The rebuke was triggered by a January 4 filing that questioned the trustworthiness of Mueller's office. Friedrich called Concord's recent filings "unprofessional, inappropriate, and ineffective," and said their "relentless personal attacks" would not affect her decision.

Alabama Association of Realtors v. HHS 
In May 2021, Friedrich vacated the temporary federal eviction moratorium issued by the Centers for Disease Control and Prevention, which had been extended multiple times since being enacted by the previous Trump administration. She ruled that the Public Health Service Act did not grant the CDC the legal authority to impose a nationwide eviction moratorium. Under the Biden administration, the CDC had sought an extension of the eviction moratorium, through June 30.

References

External links
 
 Biography at District Court for the District of Columbia
 

|-

1967 births
Living people
20th-century American lawyers
21st-century American lawyers
21st-century American judges
Alumni of University College, Oxford
Assistant United States Attorneys
George W. Bush administration personnel
Judges of the United States District Court for the District of Columbia
Lawyers from Washington, D.C.
Members of the United States Sentencing Commission
People from Chevy Chase, Maryland
People from Pensacola, Florida
Trinity University (Texas) alumni
United States district court judges appointed by Donald Trump
United States Senate lawyers
Yale Law School alumni
20th-century American women lawyers
21st-century American women lawyers
21st-century American women judges